The history of cycling in India dates back to 1938. The Cycling Federation of India takes care of the sport. Cycling is unknown as a professional sport in India but popular as a common recreational sport and it is a good way to keep fit.

Mountain biking
Mountain biking is becoming a popular sport. For the last 15 years, MTB Himachal now MTb Himalaya has been organized regularly by HASTPA, an NGO. It is attended by a number of national and international participants, including some world champions like Cory Wallace, Andy Seewald, Lui Lio pinto and Indian Army, Indian Air Force, ITBP and a number of young and energetic MTB individual riders from cities like Pune, Bangalore, Delhi and Chandigarh. Last year, the government of Sikkim (Department of Tourism) introduced its own MTB race with South East Asia's biggest prize money. The second edition saw 48 professional participants. Mtb Himalaya is now into its 15th edition and is a globally sought after race for its quality of route, challenges and competition and is now among the top toughest races globally .
MTB races are also conducted by #KalyanCyclist at Rayate about 10 km from Kalyan. They have been doing this event since 2018.

Road Cycling/Touring
The Tour of Nilgiris is a major non-competitive & non-commercial touring event in South Asia that covers 1,000 kilometres in under 10 days. The Tour of Nilgiris (TfN), India’s first Day Touring Cycle Ride, was born in 2008 with the twin objectives of promoting bicycling as an activity and spreading awareness about the bio-diversity, flora and fauna of the Nilgiris.

India has put forth its foot in randonneuring events. These are conducted under the aegis of Audax Club Parisien and are now done across India with 15 clubs doing brevets every month. Brevets begun in India in 2010. 200, 300, 400, 600, 1000 & 1200 kilometers events are conducted regularly as per the global calendar.

The Rotary Club of Madras Midtown conducted a cycle rally called K2K Tour de Rotary, from Kashmir to Kanyakumari, for the cause of Swatch Bharat.

In similar manner, Indian Cycling League conducts GPS based Cycling races to keep motivating cyclists of India.

Total medals won by Indian Cyclists in Major tournaments

References

 
Cycle racing in India